The Saudi Standards, Metrology and Quality Organization (SASO) is a technical government body in Saudi Arabia was established in 1972 and governs tasks related to standards, metrology, and quality.

Structure and Responsibilities 
SASO is administrated by a board of directors headed by the Minister of Commerce and Investment and membership of sectors interested in standardization in the Kingdom.

The responsibilities of SASO is mainly focusing on designing and approving national standards for goods, products, and services. Its tasks also include the Issuance of regulations that ensure the assessment procedures of goods, products, and services under approved standards. Promoting awareness regarding standards and quality, conducting studies and research are also involved with the responsibilities of SASO.

References 

Government agencies of Saudi Arabia
1972 establishments in Saudi Arabia
Government agencies established in 1972